Area code 55 serves Mexico City and its metropolitan area. The area code was created in 2002 as a result of the consolidation of area codes and the realignment of numbering. The consolidation mandated by the Plan Nacional de Numeracion (PNN), assigned area codes based on geography, and took place during the process of phone numbering restructure in Mexico. The process objective was to alleviate saturation of existing area codes and consisted of progressively transferring numbers from the area code to the local number.

The area code 55 covers an extensive surface and it is close to exhaustion with approximately 72,960,518  numbers assigned to this area code as of November 2018. A new overlaying area code has been assigned to Mexico City to address this issue. The new area code is 56.

States in the area code: 2

Municipalities in the area code: 45

Cities and Towns in the area code: 117

Companies providing phone service in the area code: 53

Local Number: 7 Digits

International dialing: +52 + 55 + 8 digits

References

55
Mexico City